Ammonitida is an order of ammonoid cephalopods that lived from the Jurassic through Paleocene time periods, commonly with intricate ammonitic sutures.

Ammonitida is divided into four suborders, the Phylloceratina, Lytoceratina, Ancyloceratina, and Ammonitina.

The Phylloceratina is the ancestral stock, derived from the Ceratitida near the end of the Triassic. The Phylloceratina gave rise to the Lytoceratina near the beginning of the Jurassic which in turn gave rise to the highly specialized Ancyloceratina  near the end of the Jurassic.  Both the Phylloceratina and Lytoceratina gave rise to various stocks combined in the Ammonitina.

These four suborders are further divided into different stocks, comprising various families combined into superfamilies.  Some like the Hildoceratoidea and Stephanoceratoidea are restricted to the Jurassic. Others like the Hoplitoidea and Acanthoceratoidea are known only from the Cretaceous.  Still others like the Perisphinctoidea are found in both.

References

Arkell et al., 1957.  Mesozoic Ammonoidea; Treatise on Invertebrate Paleontology, Part L, Ammonoidea. Geol Soc of America and Univ. Kansas press. R.C. Moore (Ed).   
 Classification of N. H. Landman et al. 2007

 
Ammonite taxonomy
Cephalopod orders
Jurassic first appearances
Paleocene extinctions